Kathleen Garrett is an American actress, author, and voice-over talent.

Career
Kathleen Garrett recurs in the series Power Book II: Ghost on Starz!  and Inventing Anna on Netflix. She is also in The Trial of the Chicago 7 directed by Aaron Sorkin. She recurred on Law & Order as Judge Susan Moretti and several episodes of Law & Order: Special Victims Unit as well as multiple guest star roles in other series.

Garrett performed in and co-produced the solo play, The Last Flapper by William Luce at the Tiffany Theatres in Los Angeles, receiving positive reviews.

Garrett played the role of a Vulcan captain in the Star Trek: Deep Space Nine episode "Vortex". She later appeared in Star Trek: Voyager episode "Muse" as Tanis (Kelis' species), a stage actor who portrays Captain Kathryn Janeway. Garrett worked again with Star Trek: Voyager actor Robert Beltran in Beltran's production of Hamlet, playing the role of Gertrude. Garrett played the role of Mrs. Alving in the New York City production of Henrik Ibsen's Ghosts at the Century Theatre.

Garrett voiced the role of Pamela Voorhees in trailers for the 2009 Friday the 13th, causing a controversy. Betsy Palmer thought it was her own voice in the film and threatened to sue Paramount. Paramount stated that it would be impossible to pull clean audio from the original film, since the dialogue was tied to music and sound effects, which is why they brought in Garrett to recite the iconic lines.

Garrett appeared in the Law & Order: Special Victims Unit episode based on the Dominique Strauss-Kahn case, as a character based on Anne Sinclair, the then-wife of Dominique Strauss-Kahn.

She continues to work in television, film, theatre, commercials and voice-overs.

Awards
As part of the cast of The Trial Of The Chicago 7, Garrett received the 2020 Screen Actors Guild Award for Outstanding Performance by a Cast in a Motion Picture. She also won Clio Award for Outstanding Performance of an Actor in a Commercial.
She was awarded the Los Angeles Drama Critics Circle Award, the Back Stage Garland Award, the Robbie Award, Ovation Nomination and LA Weekly nomination for her performance in the West Coast Premiere of Jean Cocteau's Indiscretions.

Personal life
Garret's memoir short-story The 'Figgers': The Day a 12 Year-Old Foiled the FBI, telling how she and her sisters foiled an FBI arrest of her father, is published in two parts by Zocalo Public Square and syndicated internationally.

References

External links

American television actresses 
Living people
Year of birth missing (living people)
Place of birth missing (living people)
21st-century American actresses
American stage actresses
American voice actresses
Clio Award winners